State Route 422 (SR 422), also known as Long Island Road, is a short  north-south state highway located entirely in the city of New Hope, Tennessee. It connects various neighborhoods of the city with its main business district and the Alabama state line. SR 422 is a winding two-lane road for its entire length.

Major intersections

References

422
Transportation in Marion County, Tennessee